Frederick Harding Turner (29 May 1888 – 10 January 1915) was a Scotland international rugby union player.

Rugby Union career

Amateur career

Turner was educated at Sedbergh and Trinity College, Oxford. He played for Oxford University, and Liverpool.

Provincial career

He played for the Whites Trial side against the Blues Trial side on 21 January 1911 while still with Oxford University.

International career

Turner was a back-row forward, who had taken the kicks in the last match before the war: a Calcutta Cup match at Inverleith (Edinburgh), which Scotland lost 15–16. James Huggan and John George Will also played in this match. He also played first-class cricket, for the Oxford University Cricket Club.

Military career

He was killed in World War I in the trenches near Kemmel on 10 January 1915 in a trench occupied by his platoon of the Liverpool Scottish when overseeing the organisation of a barbed wire entanglement.

He is buried in an isolated plot in Kemmel churchyard, not in one of the larger Commonwealth cemeteries. He was buried in the Kemmel churchyard next to Percy Dale Kendall who captained England in 1903. His grave was prepared by Dr Noel Chavasse VC and Bar, MC, who also died at Ypres in August 1917. The battlefield consumed both graves and Kendal and Turner's remains have never been found. [2]

See also
 List of international rugby union players killed in action during the First World War

References
 Bath, Richard (ed.) The Scotland Rugby Miscellany (Vision Sports Publishing Ltd, 2007 )

External links
 Commonwealth War Graves database
 An entire team wiped out by the Great War (The Scotsman)

1888 births
1915 deaths
Scottish rugby union players
Scotland international rugby union players
British military personnel killed in World War I
British Army personnel of World War I
King's Regiment (Liverpool) officers
Scottish cricketers
Oxford University cricketers
People educated at Sedbergh School
Alumni of Trinity College, Oxford
Whites Trial players
Rugby union players from Liverpool
Rugby union flankers